Kim Tae-Hoi (born 3 September 1973) is a retired South Korean high jumper.

He won the silver medal at the 2002 Asian Games. He also competed at the 1996 Olympic Games, but did not reach the final.

His personal best jump is 2.27 metres, achieved in April 1996 in Kyongju.

Achievements

References

1973 births
Living people
South Korean male high jumpers
Athletes (track and field) at the 1996 Summer Olympics
Olympic athletes of South Korea
Athletes (track and field) at the 2002 Asian Games
Asian Games medalists in athletics (track and field)
Asian Games silver medalists for South Korea
Medalists at the 2002 Asian Games
20th-century South Korean people
21st-century South Korean people